FND may refer to:

Medicine
 Frontonasal dysplasia, a facial malformation
 Functional neurological disorder, causes movement disorders, blackouts etc.

Politics
 National Democratic Front (Central African Republic)
 National Democratic Front, participant in the United Front of Political Parties and Civic Associations, Guatemala, 1944

Other
Floor & Decor, American retailer of flooring
FND Films, American sketch comedy videos group
Friday Night Dinner, British sitcom

See also
 FDN (disambiguation)
 NDF (disambiguation)